The following is a list of transfers for the 2012 Major League Soccer season.  The Montreal Impact made their first moves by signing Nelson Rivas, Hassoun Camara, Evan Bush, and Siniša Ubiparipović. On November 23, 2011, the Impact selected 10 unprotected players in the 2011 MLS Expansion Draft.  The rest of the moves were made from the 2011–2012 off-season all the way through the 2012 season.

Transfers 

 Player was never signed, only rights to player were acquired.
 Player officially joined his new club on January 1, 2012.
 Player officially joined his new club on June 27, 2012.

References

External links 
 Official Site of Major League Soccer

2012

Major League Soccer
Major League Soccer